Brittany Mesa Bell (born November 9, 1987) is an American model, dancer, and beauty pageant titleholder who was crowned Miss Guam 2014 and represented Guam at Miss Universe 2014, where she was unplaced. She had previously been crowned Miss Arizona USA 2010 and represented Arizona in Miss USA 2010.

Career
Bell was born and raised in Barrigada, Guam, to a Chamorro mother and a father of Native American, West Indian and African American heritage.

In 2009, she was crowned Miss Arizona USA 2010, as well as Miss Congeniality, As Miss Arizona, she went on to compete in the Miss USA 2010 but did not advance beyond the opening round at the pageant held in Las Vegas, Nevada, on May 16, 2010.

Bell spent three seasons as a dancer for the Phoenix Suns of the NBA. She graduated from Arizona State University in 2009 with a bachelor's degree in broadcast journalism.

Bell was crowned Miss Guam Universe 2014 and competed at Miss Universe 2014.

Personal life
She and actor Nick Cannon have three children: a son born in 2017, a daughter born in 2020 and a son born in 2022.

References

External links

                                                                                                                             

1987 births
African-American female models
American beauty pageant winners
American cheerleaders
American people who self-identify as being of Native American descent
American people of West Indian descent
Arizona State University alumni
Chamorro people
Guamanian people of African-American descent
Guamanian people of Native American descent
Guamanian people of West Indian descent
Living people
Miss Universe 2014 contestants
National Basketball Association cheerleaders
People from Barrigada
21st-century African-American people
21st-century African-American women
20th-century African-American people
20th-century African-American women